Hove Park is a park within the English city of Brighton & Hove. It is also the name of an electoral ward in Brighton and Hove whose population at the 2011 census was 10,602.

Overview
A paved path goes all round the park, approximately 1.17 miles (1.89 km) in length, and is often used by walkers and runners. There are also several paved paths cross-secting the park at various points. Brighton & Hove Albion's traditional home, the Goldstone Ground was opposite the park, until it was demolished.

Facilities include a fenced off playground, a football pitch, a basketball court, a climbing boulder and several tennis courts. The park's bowling green is no longer in use. The club pavilion and bowling green has been leased to local health & fitness club Riptide  by Brighton and Hove City Council. A cafe operates throughout the year and serves refreshments. Public toilets are located near the cafe.

In the southwest corner lies a rock called The Goldstone. Legend has it that the devil threw the approximately 20 ton rock there while excavating Devil's Dyke. Towards the north is a sculpture by the environmental artist Chris Drury; Fingermaze  is a labyrinth-like design based on a fingerprint, consisting of stones set into the turf.

Hove Park is home to the Brighton Parkrun.

Miniature steam railway 

The railway is run by the Brighton & Hove Society of Miniature Locomotive Engineers, which was formed from part of Brighton Model Engineers in 1962.

The track was upgraded to use concrete sections following damage caused by the Great Storm of 1987. Each separate section bears a plate detailing the name of the individual who sponsored it.

Sources 
 Brighton & Hove Society of Miniature Locomotive Engineers
 Brighton & Hove City Council - Hove Park

References 

Parks and open spaces in East Sussex
Hove